American Movie is a 1999 American documentary film directed by Chris Smith, produced by Smith and Sarah Price, and edited by Jun Diaz and Barry Poltermann. The film chronicles the making of Coven, an independent short horror film directed by Wisconsin-based filmmaker Mark Borchardt. Produced for the purpose of financing Northwestern, a feature film Borchardt wishes to make, Coven suffers from a troubled production, from a lack of planning to the ineptitude of the friends and family whom Borchardt enlists as his cast and crew.

American Movie received generally positive reviews, and won the Grand Jury Prize for Documentary at the 1999 Sundance Film Festival. It has since been considered a cult film.

Background
Filmed between September 1995 and August 1997, American Movie documents the making of Coven, an independent short horror film directed by filmmaker Mark Borchardt. Produced for the purpose of raising capital for Northwestern, a feature film Borchardt intends to make,  Coven suffers from numerous setbacks, including poor financing, a lack of planning, Borchardt's burgeoning alcoholism, and the ineptitude of the friends and family he enlists as his production team. The documentary follows Borchardt's filmmaking process from script to screen, and is interspersed with footage from both of Borchardt's developing projects.

The film was a critical success upon its debut and won the Grand Jury Prize for Documentary at the 1999 Sundance Film Festival. It has since gone on to be considered a cult film.

Synopsis
In 1996 in Menomonee Falls, Wisconsin, Mark Borchardt dreams of being a filmmaker. Currently however, he delivers papers for a living, is deeply indebted, still lives with his parents, is a borderline alcoholic, and is estranged from his ex-girlfriend, who is threatening to move out of state with their three children. He acknowledges his various failures, but aspires to one day make more of his life.

Hoping to jump-start his amateur filmmaking career, Mark restarts production on Northwestern, a feature-length film he has been planning for most of his adult life. Initially, the project attracts some interest from the group of amateur actors with whom Mark has produced some radio plays, but by the fourth production meeting almost no one shows up and Mark is forced to acknowledge that he currently lacks the resources to move Northwestern past the pre-production phase.

To drum up the attention and financial resources needed to film Northwestern, Mark decides to finally complete Coven (which Borchardt mispronounces with a long 'o'), a horror short that he began shooting on 16 mm film in 1994, but ultimately abandoned. He receives financing from his Uncle Bill, a wise, but increasingly senile, eighty-two-year-old retiree who lives in a dilapidated trailer despite having $280,000 in his bank account. Bill hesitantly agrees to invest in Coven, with the goal of selling three thousand VHS tapes, which Mark says will raise enough capital to finance Northwestern.

Mark restarts production on Coven, but suffers numerous mishaps. Although he is hard-working and knowledgeable about film making, he is also poor at planning ahead and inarticulate as a director. Additionally, he builds his production crew out of friends and neighbors, many of whom are incompetent at the tasks to which he assigns them. Particular attention is given to his best friend, guitarist Mike Schank, an amiable recovering alcoholic and drug addict with reduced affect who is one of the most reliable members of the crew (and also recorded the music for the soundtrack of the documentary). In their adolescence, Mark and Mike bonded over their shared love of vodka, but Mike is now sober and has joined Alcoholics Anonymous, though he has become a compulsive gambler, buying scratch-off lottery tickets from the gas station, sometimes accompanied by his AA sponsor, who then drives them both to Gamblers' Anonymous meetings; Mike reasons that, while you sometimes win and sometimes lose the lottery, you always lose with drugs and alcohol.

As the work on Coven moves forward, Mark faces the skepticism of his family and his own burgeoning alcoholism, though he does eventually wrap principal photography. At Thanksgiving dinner and, later, a family party to watch Super Bowl XXXI, he gets drunk and becomes alternately agitated, cheery, and despondent. At one point, he wistfully watches footage he shot for Northwestern back in 1990 and contemplates whether or not he is a failure.

After an extended post-production process during which Mark, and sometimes Mike and Mark's children, occasionally sleep in an editing room at University of Wisconsin–Milwaukee, Mark finally finishes work on Coven minutes before its premiere at a local theater in Milwaukee in summer of 1997. The screening sells out, and Mark's family and friends are happy that the project has finally been completed.

In the final scene, Mark goes to visit Uncle Bill and discusses the prospect of future fame and wealth and realizing the American Dream. Bill's response is a combination of rambling, cryptic, and poetic, but he seems to be advising Mark to focus on spiritual matters and bringing happiness into other people's lives. The closing text reveals that Bill died on September 13, 1997, and left Mark $50,000 in his will for the completion of Northwestern.

Reception and legacy
On the review aggregation website Rotten Tomatoes, the film has an approval rating of 94% based on 49 reviews, with a weighted average of 8.28/10; the site's consensus reads: "Well worth watching for film buffs and anyone who believes in following your dreams, American Movie is a warm, funny, and engrossing ode to creative passion". Janet Maslin of The New York Times wrote that the film conveys Borchardt's passion "Insightfully and stirringly, not to mention hilariously", and that "For anyone wondering where the spirit of maverick independent filmmaking has its source, you need look no further". Roger Ebert gave the film four out of four possible stars, calling it "a very funny, sometimes very sad documentary".

Amy Goodman of IndieWire called the film "An inspiration for filmmakers everywhere", and Kevin Thomas of the Los Angeles Times wrote that it "is sure to draw lots of laughs". Glenn Lovell of Variety called the film an "ambitious, wildly funny chronicle" and a "madcap tribute to a beer-guzzling Midwestern filmmaker".

Awards
The film was awarded the Grand Jury Prize for Documentary at the 1999 Sundance Film Festival. In 2004, it was named by The New York Times as one of the "1,000 Greatest Movies Ever Made", and the International Documentary Association named it as one of the top 20 documentaries of all time.

Home media
The film was released on VHS on January 16, 2001. It was released on DVD by Sony Pictures Home Entertainment on May 23, 2000, as a "Special Edition", which includes a commentary by Chris Smith, Sarah Price, Mark Borchardt, and Mike Schank, as well as the short film Coven and 22 deleted scenes.

Notes

References

External links
 
 
 Official trailer on YouTube

Documentary films about films
American documentary films
1999 documentary films
Films shot in Wisconsin
1999 films
Documentary films about horror
Films directed by Chris Smith
1990s English-language films
Sony Pictures Classics films
1990s American films